Hemingway & Gellhorn is a 2012 television film directed by Philip Kaufman about the lives of journalist Martha Gellhorn and her husband, writer Ernest Hemingway. The film premiered at the 2012 Cannes Film Festival and aired on HBO on May 28, 2012.

Plot
This drama tells the story of one of America’s most famous literary couples. The film begins in 1936, when the pair meet for the first time in a chance encounter in a Key West bar in Florida.

They encounter one another once again a year later in Spain, while both are covering the Spanish Civil War, and staying in the same hotel on the same floor. Initially, Gellhorn resists romantic advances made by the famous Hemingway, but during a bombing raid, the two find themselves trapped alone in the same room, and they are overcome by lust. They become lovers, and stay in Spain until 1939. Hemingway collaborates with Joris Ivens to produce The Spanish Earth.

In 1940 Hemingway divorces his second wife so that he and Gellhorn can be married. He credits her with having inspired him to write the novel, For Whom the Bell Tolls (1940), and dedicates the work to her.

Over time, however, Gellhorn becomes more prominent in her own right, leading to certain career jealousies between the two. Gellhorn leaves Hemingway to go to Finland to cover the Winter War by herself. When she returns to the Lookout Farm in Havana, Hemingway tells her that he has divorced Pauline.

The two marry and, together, travel to China to cover the bombing attacks by Japan. In China, they interview Chiang Kai-shek and his spouse. Gellhorn is horrified after visiting an opium den. Chiang Kai-shek is fighting the Chinese Communists and Japanese invaders. The two secretly visit Zhou Enlai. Gellhorn covered D-Day in Normandy.  She reported on the Dachau and Auschwitz concentration camps.

Lastly, in 1945, Gellhorn became the only one of Hemingway's four wives to ask him for a divorce.

Cast

 Nicole Kidman as Martha Gellhorn
 Clive Owen as Ernest Hemingway
 David Strathairn as John Dos Passos
 Molly Parker as Pauline Pfeiffer
 Parker Posey as Mary Welsh Hemingway
 Rodrigo Santoro as Paco Zarra (based on José Robles)
 Mark Pellegrino as Max Eastman
 Peter Coyote as Maxwell Perkins
 Lars Ulrich as Joris Ivens
 Robert Duvall as General Petrov
 Tony Shalhoub as Mikhail Koltsov
 Leonard Apeltsin as Russian Operative
 Jeffrey Jones as Charles Colebaugh
 Santiago Cabrera as Robert Capa
 Aitor Inarra as Felipe Leon
 Diane Baker as Mrs. Gellhorn
 Steven Wiig as Simo Häyhä
 Keone Young as Mr. Ma
 Joan Chen as Madame Chiang
 Malcolm Brownson as Orson Welles
 Ivonne Coll as Gypsy Crone

Production
Pat Jackson, the film's sound effects editor, said that the biggest challenge in doing sound for the film was "making the archival footage and the live-action footage shot locally appear seamless." Much of the film was shot in the San Francisco Bay Area, with the abandoned 16th Street station in Oakland standing in for the Hotel Florida.

Reception
The film received mixed reviews with much praise going for Nicole Kidman's portrayal of Martha Gellhorn. Mark Rozeman of Paste commented "In terms of the acting, there’s little room for complaint. At 45, Kidman remains a fetching and powerful screen presence. Here, she captures Gellhorn’s idealistic, gung-ho leftism without making herself sound overly self-righteous" but was less positive about Clive Owen's role as Ernest Hemingway stating "While Owen easily embodies Hemingway’s extraordinary charisma (and certainly his legendary temper), his performance is often undermined by the British actor’s inability to hold his American accent." Jeremy Heilman of MovieMartyr.com agreed with Roseman's opinions stating "Kidman is strong here as Martha Gellhorn, using her exceptional figure and old-fashioned movie star glamour to full effect" and that Owen's performance was "inconsistent, goofy one moment and strongly seductive the next." Todd McCarthy of The Hollywood Reporter said, "Kidman is terrific in certain scenes and merely very good in others; there are a few too many moments of her traipsing around Spain, blond hair flying glamorously, not knowing quite what she’s doing there. But for the most part, she rivets one’s attention, lifting the entire enterprise by her presence. Odie Henderson, writing for Roger Ebert.com, praised both actors performances while lauding the film's throwback feeling of romance. "The actors are first-rate, down to the supporting roles...This is Kidman's best work in years, smart, brassy, funny, sexy and tough. She brings her A-game because Owen's showier role must be legendary, a larger than life evocation of masculinity suited for the name Hemingway. Cinematographer Rogier Stoffers introduces Owen in a desaturated fishing sequence that culminates in an explosion of bright red blood. Owen's Hemingway grabs the bull by the horns, resisting cliché just barely enough to feel the breath of caricature on his neck. His Russian Roulette pissing contest with an uncredited, equally macho and over the top Robert Duvall is a highlight of the film. Anyone with a romantic appreciation of the male gender will swoon at Owen's constantly revealed chest hair. Everyone else can worship, as Kaufman's camera does, at the altar of Kidman's lower body, with its "legs that start at her shoulders."

The New York Times panned the film, characterizing it as "a disheartening misfire: a big, bland historical melodrama built on platitudes about honor and the writing life that crams in actual figures and incidents but does little to illuminate them, or to make us care about the romance at its center." In a similar vein Vanity Fair observed that "none of the reviews quite prepared me for the unchained malady of Hemingway & Gellhorn." Of the director they say "it’s as if Kaufman answered the call of wild and it turned out to be a loon." The Huffington Post described it as "a gigantic missed opportunity, a jaw-droppingly trying waste of time. Don't let the fancy names in the cast fool you: This is a stupid, stupid movie." Rotten Tomatoes gives the film a 49% score based on 49 reviews, with an average rating of 5.33/10.

Accolades

References

External links

2010s English-language films
Films directed by Philip Kaufman
Films set in the 1930s
Films set in the 1940s
Films shot in San Francisco
Films set in Cuba
Films set in Spain
Spanish Civil War films
HBO Films films
Films with screenplays by Jerry Stahl
Works about Ernest Hemingway
Cultural depictions of Ernest Hemingway
Cultural depictions of Chiang Kai-shek
Cultural depictions of Orson Welles
2012 television films
2012 films
Films scored by Javier Navarrete